{
  "type": "ExternalData",
  "service": "page",
  "title": "New Jersey State Highway Renumbering 1927.map"
}
In 1927, New Jersey's state highways were renumbered. The old system, which had been defined in sequence by the legislature since 1916, was growing badly, as several routes shared the same number, and many unnumbered state highways had been defined. A partial renumbering was proposed in 1926, but instead a total renumbering was done in 1927.

Some amendments were made in 1929, including the elimination of Route 18N (by merging it into Route 1), and the addition of more spurs, as well as Route 29A, but the system stayed mostly intact until the 1953 renumbering.

Proposed 1926 Renumbering 
A partial renumbering was proposed in 1926 to get rid of the duplicates and assigning numbers to many of the unnumbered routes. The proposed 1926 renumbering would have:

 extended Route 4 over Route 19
 renumbered Route 17N to Route 17
 renumbered Route 18N to Route 18
 renumbered Route 18S to Route 19
 designated Route 21 from Trenton to Buttzville
 renumbered Route 17S to Route 22
 renumbered Route 18 (unsuffixed) to Route 23
 designated Route 24 from Mount Holly to Freehold
 renumbered the Route 20 "from a point on Route No. 3, extending by way of West Berlin, Gibbsboro and Haddonfield, connecting with Haddon Avenue in the Borough of Haddonfield, and continuing to approach the Delaware River Bridge" to Route 25, and extended it from West Berlin to Blue Anchor 
 designated Route 26 from Five Points to Hammonton
 designated Route 27 from Camden to Atlantic City
 designated Route 28 from South Amboy to Atlantic Highlands
 designated Route 29 from Morristown to Hackettstown
 designated Route 30 from Far Hills to Tri-State

It was eventually determined that an entire overhaul of the numbering system was necessary.

Design 
Chapter 319 of the 1927 public laws defined the new system of routes. Major roads received numbers from 1 to 12 and 21 to 50, as follows:

1-12: northern New Jersey
21-28: radiating from Newark
29-37: radiating from Trenton
38-47: radiating from Camden
48-50: southern New Jersey

Spurs were also defined, being assigned a prefix of S. For example, Route S26 was a short spur of Route 26 connecting to Route 25 south of New Brunswick. A second spur of Route 4 was assigned Route S4A, but two separate spurs of Route 24 both received the Route S24 designation.

While the majority of already-acquired routes were included in the new system, four sections of pre-1927 routes were not. The law authorizing the renumbering indicated that these were to remain, and so the State Highway Commission added a suffix of N to distinguish them from the new routes of the same number:

Route 4N from pre-1927 Route 4, Eatontown to Belmar
Route 5N from pre-1927 Route 5, Morris Plains to Denville
Route 8N from pre-1927 Route 8, Sussex to Unionville, New York
Route 18N from pre-1927 Route 18N, Fort Lee to Alpine

List of new routes

Additions

1929 Amendment 
Chapter 126 of the 1929 public law amended the 1927 act, removing redundant designations and creating entirely new roads in the New York Metropolitan Area. The amendments included

 Realigning Route 1 onto Route 18N, still left over from the first 1916 system
 Establishing Route S1A, today Route 67, from the remnants of Route 18N not taken over by Route 1 (Lemoine and Palisades Avenues)
 Truncating Route 3 to the Hawthorne-Paterson Line
 Establishing Route S3 (served by modern Route 3), running from Route 3 in East Rutherford to Route 6 in Clifton
 Declaring that Route S4A would be built, "provided, however, the county of Atlantic shall first agree to construct a suitable continuation of said road from Little Beach to the city of Atlantic City". Atlantic County was unable to build most of this extension, hence Route S4A was never built; the portions that were built became designated as Route 87
 Establishing Route S4B, replacing the truncated sections of Route 3 (served today by Route 208)
 Truncating Route 5 to roughly its current length, with an extension to the centre of Ridgefield
 Realigning Route S5 onto the southern portion of Grand Avenue (modern Route 93)
 Realigning Route 6 to a new alignment east of Caldwell Township, bypassing Paterson
 Creating Route S6 (including modern Route 62) along the portions of Union Boulevard formerly used by Route 6
 Truncating Route 7 to Wallington

Other Additions

Notes

See also

List of state highways in New Jersey before 1927
1953 New Jersey state highway renumbering

References

External links
1920s New Jersey Highways

 renumbering 1927
New Jersey State Highway Renumbering, 1927
New Jersey State Highway Renumbering, 1927
Highway renumbering in the United States